Sonepat-Kharkhoda Industrial Model Township land case being investigated by the Central Bureau of Investigation (CBI) against Bhupinder Singh Hooda. This under-investigation scam pertains to acquisition of 700 acre land in 3 villages near Kharkhoda in Sonepat district for the Industrial Model Township.. Punjab and Haryana High Court in March 2013 and the Supreme Court of India in May 2016 had cancelled the government's decision to release land to the private builder. Two senior officials in then Chief Minister Hooda's office were indicted for allegedly favouring the developers. Subsequently, in 2018 the Government of Haryana referred the case to CBI to investigate the against Hooda and others.

There are a total of 6 CBI cases and several other vigilance department investigations against Hooda underway. Central Bureau of Investigation is investigating several scams, mostly related to illegal land grab, that took place during his rule in Haryana. These investigations include the Gurugram-Manesar IMT land scam, Robert Vadra DLF land grab scam, Gurugram Rajiv Gandhi Trust land grab scam, Garhi Sampla Uddar Gagan land scam, Panchkula-HUDA Industrial plots allotment scam, AJL-National Herald Panchkula land grab scam, Haryana Forestry scam case and Haryana Raxil drug purchase scam. He has been already chargesheeted in the Manesar-Gurugram land scam, while other cases are still under investigation (c. March 2018). Hooda was acquiring land from poor, illiterate  farmers at a low rate in the name of "public interest" only to later license this to builders after granting out-of-turn favors that helped the land value increase exponentially. During his 10-year rule as Chief Minister, Hooda, licensed a massive 24,825 acres of land compared to just 8,550.32 acres by successive Chief Ministers in the 23 years preceding Hooda rule.

Details

Modus of scam

Ashok Khemka, a senior Indian Administrative Service officer in of Haryana known for exposing corruption and for cancelling the mutation of Sonia Gandhi's son-in-law Robert Vadra's illegal land deal in Gurgaon, had written to Chief Minister and Chief Secretary of Haryana to seek the CBI investigation, with the findings that both Rohtak and Sonipat land scams were more blatant than the Manesar scam. In 2005, Haryana State Industrial and Infrastructure Development Corporation (HSIIDC) notified 885 acres for acquisition for housing colony for industrial workers in sectors 59 and 60 of Sonipat, out of which 300-acre land was illegally released to a private builder.

418 acres in Sonipat was released from acquisition in the same way as it was done in Gurugram-Manesar IMT land scam Manesar during Hooda’s administration.
642 acres of land in 5 villages was notified for acquisition for developing residential and commercial sectors, by Haryana Urban Development Authority, and a notification was issued on 16 January 2004 to acquire 623.70 acres resulting in sales of land by farmers to builders at throwaway prices under the threat of acquisition. Once 418 acre of notified land was acquired by builders at throwaway prices, this was denotified and released from the acquisition, resulting in the illegal windfall gains for the builders at the expense of farmers.

Current status: CBI inquiry
Subsequently, in March 2018 the Chief Minister Manohar Lal Khattar BJP's Government of Haryana referred the case to CBI to conduct further investigation against Hooda and others. Supreme Court had also ordered Haryana Government to take action on the Dhingra Commission's report, set up to investigate grant of land licences, so that "pending issues could be cracked".

See also
 Corruption in India
 National Herald scam
 Rajiv Gandhi Charitable Trust land grab cases
 Robert Vadra land grab cases
 List of scams in India

References

High Courts of India cases
21st-century scandals
Cover-ups
Criminal investigation
Corruption in India
Lawsuits
Trials in India
Corruption in Haryana
Supreme Court of India cases
Political corruption in India
Indian National Congress of Haryana